Adenonema is a genus of flowering plants belonging to the family Caryophyllaceae.

Its native range is Central Asia to Russian Far East and North China.

Species:

Adenonema cherleriae 
Adenonema petraeum

References

Caryophyllaceae
Caryophyllaceae genera
Taxa named by Alexander von Bunge